Tun Datuk Seri Panglima Sakaran Mohd Hashim bin Dandai (15 April 1930 – 30 August 2021) was a Malaysian politician.

Biography
He served as the 8th Yang di-Pertua Negeri of Sabah from January 1995 to December 2002, 8th Chief Minister of Sabah briefly from March 1994 to December 1994 and Member of Parliament (MP) for Semporna from August 1986 to April 1995. 

In August 2021, Sakaran Dandai was diagnosed with COVID-19 and admitted to intensive care unit (ICU) at Gleneagles Hospital, Kota Kinabalu. On 30 August at 5:30 a.m., Sakaran aged 91, died due to COVID-19. He was buried at Makam Pahlawan near the Sabah State Mosque in Kota Kinabalu.

Election results

Awards and recognitions

Honours of Malaysia 
  :
  Commander of the Order of Loyalty to the Crown of Malaysia (PSM) – Tan Sri (1990)
  Grand Commander of the Order of the Defender of the Realm (SMN) – Tun (1996)

Places named after him
Several places were named after him, including:
 Tun Sakaran Marine Park in Semporna, Sabah
 Tun Sakaran Museum in Semporna, Sabah
 SMK Agama Tun Sakaran, a secondary school in Semporna, Sabah

See also
 List of deaths due to COVID-19 - notable individual deaths

References 

1930 births
2021 deaths
People from Sabah
Bajau people
Malaysian Muslims
United Sabah National Organisation politicians
United Malays National Organisation politicians
Yang di-Pertua Negeri of Sabah
Chief Ministers of Sabah
Sabah state ministers
Members of the Sabah State Legislative Assembly
Government ministers of Malaysia
Members of the Dewan Rakyat
Commanders of the Order of Loyalty to the Crown of Malaysia
Grand Commanders of the Order of the Defender of the Realm
Deaths from the COVID-19 pandemic in Malaysia
20th-century Malaysian politicians
21st-century Malaysian politicians